Danger! And Other Stories is a collection of short stories by Sir Arthur Conan Doyle published in 1918.

Title story
The collection's title story, "Danger! Being the Log of Captain John Sirius", was written 18 months before the outbreak of World War I and first published in the Strand Magazine in July 1914. It depicts an imaginary country in Europe fighting - and defeating - Britain, and is intended to direct public attention to the great danger (submarines) which threatened the country.

Plot summary
The story describes Britain's need to update its naval preparations.  Norland, a fictional small country in Europe has been fighting England and is now invaded by an English army.  However, Norland has a naval flotilla of submarines commanded by Captain John Sirius.  Sirius uses his submarines to lay a naval blockade around the British Isles, so that no supplies can be landed.  Consequently, the British start suffering famine.  Some of the submarines are sunk and the British are congratulating themselves, when Sirius, waiting outside Liverpool, purposely torpedoes a large White Star liner, the RMS Olympic.  The British end up surrendering.

Analysis
The story correctly anticipates the U-boat strategy which Germany would use in both World Wars to target ships bringing the foodstuffs Britain was unable to produce domestically. As would be confirmed by the events, the story forecast the need for the attackers to also target American ships bringing supplies to Britain - even at the price of violating International Law - forcing the British to introduce rationing among their population. 

At the time numerous popular writings portrayed England facing Germany in an upcoming war. The best remembered include Erskine Childers' The Riddle of the Sands: A Record of Secret Service (1903) and "Saki"'s When William Came: A Story of London Under the Hohenzollerns  (1913).  Doyle's story is another example of this genre of invasion literature. Ironically, its conclusion foretold the fate of the Cunard liner Lusitania two years later.

Doyle uses a particular stylistic technique to evoke emotion in British readers, making them more receptive to the writer's warnings: the first person narration by the victorious enemy commander, full of gloating and condescension towards the "stupid" Britons.

Norland
Norland is depicted as a North European country, with a shore on the North Sea. It seems to be linguistically Germanic - "Norrland" and "Nordland" are the names of a region in Sweden and a county in Norway, respectively, and Norland's main port is Blankenberg, the name of several actual German cities. Norland is, however, not Germany, which is mentioned as neutral in the war, though Germans are depicted as sympathetic to Norland's cause. Norland has a colonial empire, and a border dispute with a British colony, exacerbated by the death of two missionaries, is the direct cause of the war. Norland is a monarchy whose monarch seems to retain actual executive power; the crucial policy meeting in which it is resolved to defy a British ultimatum and embark on submarine warfare is attended by the king, the foreign secretary, an admiral, and Captain Sirius; a prime minister is conspicuously absent.

Contents
"Danger! Being the Log of Captain John Sirius"
"One Crowded Hour"
"A Point of View"
"The Fall of Lord Barrymore"
"The Horror of the Heights"
"Borrowed Scenes"
"The Surgeon of Gaster Fell"
"How It Happened"
"The Prisoner's Defence"
"Three of Them"

References

External links

 
 
 

Works by Arthur Conan Doyle
1918 short story collections
Works about submarine warfare